The Madonna and Child with St. Anne (Dei Palafrenieri) is one of the mature religious works of the Italian Baroque master Caravaggio, painted in 1605–1606, for the altar of the Archconfraternity of the Papal Grooms  in the Basilica of Saint Peter. The painting was briefly exhibited in the parish church for the Vatican, Sant'Anna dei Palafrenieri, before its removal, presumably due to its unorthodox portrayal of the Virgin. It was subsequently sold to Cardinal Scipione Borghese, and now hangs in his palazzo (Galleria Borghese), where it shares space along with five other Caravaggios: Boy with a Basket of Fruit, David with the head of Goliath (attributed to 1606), Young Sick Bacchus, Saint Jerome Writing, and St John the Baptist in the Desert.

While not his most successful arrangement, it is an atypical representation of the Virgin for its time, and must have been shocking to some contemporary viewers. The allegory, at its core, is simple. The Virgin with the aid of her son, whom she holds, tramples on a serpent, the emblem of evil or original sin. Saint Anne, whom the painting is intended to honor, is a wrinkled old grandmother, witnessing the event. Flimsy halos crown the upright; the snake recoils in anti-halos. Both Mary and Jesus are barefoot; Jesus is a fully naked uncircumcised child. All else is mainly shadow, and the figures gain monumentality in the light.

Other works
The model for the Virgin can also be found in Caravaggio's Madonna di Loreto.
Contrast this tense scene with the famous, more peaceful arrangement of the family by Leonardo in his Virgin and Child with St. Anne.

See also
List of paintings by Caravaggio

Notes

External links
Madonna dei Palafrenieri 1606 Oil on canvas, 292 x 211 cm Galleria Borghese, Rome—online catalog, Web Gallery of Art, Hungary friendly format for printing and bookmarking (link with frames, http://www.wga.hu/frames-e.html?/html/c/caravagg/08/48palaf.html)
Madonna and child with st Anne 1606 - by Caravaggio link to Caravaggio.org

1600s paintings
Paintings by Caravaggio
Dei Palafrenieri
Paintings in the Borghese Collection
Paintings of the Madonna and Child
Nude art
Snakes in art